The distal convoluted tubule (DCT) is a portion of kidney nephron between the loop of Henle and the collecting tubule.

Physiology 
It is partly responsible for the regulation of potassium, sodium, calcium, and pH. 

On its apical surface (lumen side), cells of the DCT have a thiazide-sensitive Na-Cl cotransporter and are permeable to Ca, via the TRPV5 channel. On the basolateral surface (peritubular capillary side) there is an ATP-dependent Na/K antiporter pump, a secondary active Na/Ca transporter, and an ATP dependent Ca transporter. The basolateral ATP dependent Na/K pump produces the gradient for Na to be absorbed from the apical surface via the Na/Cl symporter, and for Ca to be reclaimed into the blood by the Na/Ca basolateral antiporter.

 It regulates pH by absorbing bicarbonate and secreting protons (H+) into the filtrate, or by absorbing protons and secreting bicarbonate into the filtrate.
 Sodium and potassium levels are controlled by secreting K+ and absorbing Na+. Sodium absorption by the distal tubule is mediated by the hormone aldosterone. Aldosterone increases sodium reabsorption. Sodium and chloride (salt) reabsorption is also mediated by a group of kinases called WNK kinases.
 It also participates in calcium regulation by reabsorbing Ca2+ in response to parathyroid hormone. PTH effect is mediated through phosphorylation of regulatory proteins and enhancing the synthesis of all transporters within the distal convoluted tubule.
 Arginine vasopressin receptor 2 is also expressed in the DCT.

Clinical significance
Thiazide diuretics inhibit Na+/Cl− reabsorption from the DCT by blocking the thiazide-sensitive Na-Cl cotransporter.

By inhibiting the transporter, thiazide diuretics increase the gradient potential for Na. This increases the activity of the basolateral Na/Ca antiport and causes the increase in calcium reclamation associated with thiazide diuretics.

Histology  
The DCT is lined with simple cuboidal cells that are shorter than those of the proximal convoluted tubule (PCT).  The lumen appears larger in DCT than the PCT lumen because the PCT has a brush border (microvilli).  DCT can be recognized by its numerous mitochondria, basal enfoldings and lateral membrane interdigitations with neighboring cells.

The point where DCT contacts the cortical thick ascending limb of the loop of Henle is called macula densa.  It has tightly packed columnar cells which display reversed polarity and may monitor the osmolarity of blood.

Histologically, cells of the DCT can be differentiated from cells of the proximal convoluted tubule:

Additional images

References

External links 
 
 

Kidney anatomy

fr:Néphron#Tubule contourné distal